This is a list of FIPS 10-4 region codes from G-I, using a standardized name format, and cross-linking to articles.

On September 2, 2008, FIPS 10-4 was one of ten standards withdrawn by NIST as a Federal Information Processing Standard. The list here is the last version of codes. For earlier versions, see link below.

GA: The Gambia

GB: Gabon

GG: Georgia

GH: Ghana

GJ: Grenada

GL: Greenland 
Lansdele (pre 2009)

Since 1953, and probably earlier, Greenland was divided into three lansdele ("country-parts"), sometimes called amter (counties), as shown above.  In 2009 the lansdele were abolished and replaced by four kommuner.
Kommuner (post 2009)

GM: Germany

GR: Greece

GT: Guatemala

GV: Guinea

GY: Guyana

HA: Haiti

HO: Honduras

HK: Hong Kong

HR: Croatia

HU: Hungary

IC: Iceland

ID: Indonesia

IN: India

IR: Iran

IS: Israel

IT: Italy

IV: Côte d'Ivoire

IZ: Iraq

See also
 List of FIPS region codes (A-C)
 List of FIPS region codes (D-F)
 List of FIPS region codes (J-L)
 List of FIPS region codes (M-O)
 List of FIPS region codes (P-R)
 List of FIPS region codes (S-U)
 List of FIPS region codes (V-Z)

Sources
 FIPS 10-4 Codes and history
 Last version of codes
 All codes (include earlier versions)
 Table to see the evolution of the codes over time
 Administrative Divisions of Countries ("Statoids"), Statoids.com

References

Region codes